The Indira Gandhi Canal (originally, Rajasthan Canal) is the longest canal in India. It starts at the Harike Barrage near Harike, a few kilometers downriver from the confluence of the Satluj and Beas rivers in Punjab state, and ends in irrigation facilities in the Thar Desert in the northwest of Rajasthan state. Previously known as the Rajasthan Canal, it was renamed the Indira Gandhi Canal on 2 November 1984 following the assassination of Prime Minister Indira Gandhi.

The canal consists of the Rajasthan feeder canal with the first  in Punjab and Haryana state and a further  in Rajasthan. The canal enters Haryana from Punjab near Lohgarh and runs through the western part of the Sirsa district before entering Rajasthan near Kharakhera village in the Tibbi tehsil of the Hanumangarh district.

It traverses seven districts of Rajasthan: Barmer, Bikaner, Churu, Hanumangarh, Jaisalmer, Jodhpur, and Sriganganagar. From the end point of SMGS, another 92-kilometer-long sub-branch starts, the last of the Baba Ramdev sub-branch. It ends near Gunjangarh village in Jaisalmer district.

Design and construction 
The idea of bringing the waters from the Himalayan Rivers flowing through Punjab and into Pakistan was conceived by hydraulic engineer Kanwar Sain in the late 1940s. Sain estimated that  of desert land in Bikaner and the northwest corner of Jaisalmer could be irrigated by the stored waters of Punjab rivers.
In 1960, the Indus Water Treaty was signed between India and Pakistan, which gave India the right to use the water from three rivers: the Satluj, Beas and Ravi.

The initial plan was to build the canal in two stages. It was scheduled to be completed by 1971.

The canal faced severe financial constraints, neglect and corruption. In 1970 the plan was revised and it was decided that the entire canal would be lined with concrete tiles. Stage I was completed in 1983 around 20 years behind the completion schedule.

Effect on the region

 
  
Mustard, cotton, and wheat now grow in this semi-arid northwestern region, replacing the soil there previously. However, many dispute the success of this canal in arid regions and question whether it has achieved its goals.

References

Sources
Anon. 1998. Statistical Abstract Rajasthan. Directorate of Economic and Statistics, Rajasthan, Jaipur.
Balak Ram, 1999. Report on Wastelands in Hanumangarh district, Rajasthan. CAZRI, Jodhpur.
 Karimkoshteh, M. H. 1995. Greening the Desert (Agro-Economic impact of IG canal). Renaissance Publication, New Delhi.
Kavadia, P.S. 1991. Problem of waterlogging in Indira Gandhi Nahar Project and outline of Action Plan to tackle it. 
Singh, S. and Kar, A. 1997. Desertification Control - In the arid ecosystem of India for sustainable development. Agro-Botanical Publishers, Bikaner.
Burdak, L. R. 1982. Recent advances in Desert Afforestation, Dehradun.

Canals in Punjab, India
Interbasin transfer
Canals in Rajasthan
Irrigation canals
1983 establishments in Rajasthan
Canals opened in 1983